Calytrix fraseri, commonly known as pink summer calytrix or pink summer starflower, is a species of plant in the myrtle family Myrtaceae that is endemic to Western Australia.

Description
It usually blooms between November and August producing pink-purple-yellow star-shaped flowers which gave contrasting stamens. The foliage is evergreen with on open or dense habit.

It can be grown from seed, softwood cutting or semi-hardwood cutting. It is grown in garden beds in pots suitable for cut flowers and attracts bees and other insects. The plant will tolerate light frost and is drought resistant.

Distribution
Found on sand-plains, sand dunes and among granite outcrops in a small area along the west coast in the Mid West, Wheatbelt and South West regions of Western Australia where it grows on sandy soils. It is found as far north as Kalbarri and as far east as Lake Grace.

Classification
The species was first formally described by the botanist Allan Cunningham in 1834 in the journal Botanical Magazine.
The plant is named in honour of Charles Fraser, first superintendent of the Sydney botanical gardens and colonial botanist.

References

fraseri
Endemic flora of Western Australia
Myrtales of Australia
Rosids of Western Australia
Plants described in 1834
Taxa named by Allan Cunningham (botanist)